Harald Fritzsch (born 10 February 1943 in Zwickau, Germany, died 16 August 2022 in München) was a German theoretical physicist known for his contributions to the theory of quarks, the development of Quantum Chromodynamics and the great unification of the standard model of particle physics.

Education and career 
After completing his education in Zwickau 1961, he became Soldier of the Nationale Volksarmee of the GDR. He studied Physics in Leipzig from 1963 to 1968. After fleeing to West Germany, he continued his studies in Munich where he finished his Ph.D. under the supervision of Heinrich Mitter.

In 1970 Fritzsch visited the Aspen Center for Physics, where he met Murray Gell-Mann. They started a collaboration, first in Aspen, later at the California Institute of Technology. In 1971 they introduced the concept of the colour charge quantum number which allowed them in collaboration with William A. Bardeen to explain the decay rate of pions. In the fall of 1971 Fritzsch and Gell-Mann moved to Geneva in Switzerland, where they worked together at CERN. They proposed a gauge theory for the strong interaction, which now is called Quantumchromodynamics. In September 1972 they moved back to Caltech. In 1975 Fritzsch published a paper together with Peter Minkowski in which they proposed the symmetry group SO(10) as the symmetry of the grand unified theory which has become a standard theory. In 1976 Fritzsch moved to CERN. After working for one year at the University of Wuppertal and the University of Bern, Fritzsch became professor at the Ludwig Maximilian University of Munich in 1980.

Fritzsch worked also on "composite models" of leptons and quarks, mass matrices of quarks and leptons, weak decays of heavy quarks, cosmology and the fundamental constants of physics. He retired in 2008 and died 16 August 2022 in München.

In 1971 Fritzsch married Brigitte Goralski. They had two children.

Works 
 Quarks: The Stuff of Matter (1989)
 The Creation of Matter: The Universe from Beginning to End (1984)
 An Equation That Changed the World: Newton, Einstein, and the Theory of Relativity (1997)
 The Curvature of Spacetime: Newton, Einstein, and Gravitation (2005)
 Elementary Particles: Building Blocks of Matter (2005)
 Escape From Leipzig (2008)
 The Fundamental Constants: A Mystery of Physics (2009,  (paperback))
 You Are Wrong, Mr Einstein!: Newton, Einstein, Heisenberg and Feynman Discussing Quantum Mechanics (2011)
 Microcosmos: The World of Elementary Particles: Fictional Discussions between Einstein, Newton, and Gell-Mann (2013)
 50 Years of Quarks (with Murray Gell-Mann, 2015)

References

1943 births
Living people
20th-century German physicists
Theoretical physicists
Academic staff of the Ludwig Maximilian University of Munich
People associated with CERN
21st-century German physicists